People is the debut studio album by Irish rock group Hothouse Flowers, released in May 1988.

Track listing

Personnel 
Hothouse Flowers
 Liam Ó Maonlaí – piano, lead vocals, Hammond organ, harmonica, bodhrán, vibraphone, marimba
 Fiachna Ó Braonáin – electric and acoustic guitars, backing vocals, electric sitar
 Peter O'Toole – bass, backing vocals, electric guitar, mandolin, bouzouki
 Leo Barnes – saxophone, backing vocals
 Jerry Fehily – drums, percussion

Additional musicians
 Claudia Fontaine - backing vocals (1, 3–5, 8)
 Jimmy Chambers - backing vocals (2, 9, 11)
 Jimmy Helms - backing vocals (2, 9, 11)
 Alicia Previn (aka. Lovely Previn) - electric fiddle (4)
 Luís Jardim - percussion

Charts

Weekly charts

Certifications

References 

1988 debut albums
Hothouse Flowers albums
Albums produced by Alan Winstanley
Albums produced by Clive Langer
London Records albums